Bonwire is a town in Ghana, where the most popular cloth in Africa, popularly known as "Kente", originated. The Kente is worn by the king of the Ashanti Kingdom in Ghana.  Bonwire is part of Ejisu-Juaben Municipal district within Ghana's Ashanti Region. The town is located about 18 km on the Kumasi-Mampong road.

History
Bonwire is the home of the famous Akan Kente cloth. According to history, two friends from the town learnt how to weave by watching how a spider spun its web. The two brothers by name Kuragu and Ameyaw in around the middle of the 17th century were hunters by profession. They studied the spider's way and manner weaving its nest in the forest. After they did some experiments, they brought up with a type of fabric commonly known in the Asante-Twi as "Nwin-Ntom" meaning Woven-cloth in the English Language. They showed their discovery to the chief of Bonwire at that time called Nana Bobie Ansah. He accompanied them to Kumasi to show their invention to the King of the Ashanti Otumfuo Opemso Osei Tutu I. The King was interested by this discovery and adopted it as a royal art. "Gagamuga" was the first cloth that was made. Years later, the two brothers improved the form of their discovery. This new form had the looks of the surface of a basket locally known as "Kenten". The people of the town called the new design, (Kenten-Nwin-Ntoma), a woven-basket-cloth. It was later corrupted to Kente. The new King of the Asantes called Otumfuo Okatakyie Opoku Ware created a Kente-stool for the two brothers after they reported the improved design to him in 1721.

Kente Museum 
In October 2020, the vice president of Ghana, Dr Mahamudu Bawumia cut the sod for the commencement of construction of the Bonwire Kente Museum. This was to facilitate the mass production of kente for export and as an avenue for job creation.

Education
Bonwire is also known for the Bonwire Secondary Technical School.  The school is a second cycle institution.

References

External links

 Ashanti Region - Touring Ghana

Populated places in the Ashanti Region